Founded in 1944 and incorporated by Royal Charter in 1975, The Institute of Measurement and Control (InstMC) is a professional members' institution for individuals and companies that operate within the measurement and control industries. Its aims are to advance the science and practice of measurement and control technologies and their various applications, to foster the exchange of views and the communication of knowledge and ideas in these activities, and to promote the professional qualification and standing of its members. The institute is both a learned society and a professional qualifying body. InstMC is registered with the Engineering Council and is one of the licensed member institutions allowed to register Chartered Engineers (CEng)

The institute is the UK member body of the International Measurement Confederation (IMEKO) and is the secretariat to the United Kingdom Automatic Control Council (UKACC).

Special Interest Groups 
This Institute currently has a range of Special Interest Groups that organize conferences, seminars and training courses on subjects in the measurement and control fields. Special Interest Groups contribute to national programmes in areas such as standards and training, and join with other organisations to provide expert input to inform government policy. Each Special Interest Group has a panel of volunteer members and external experts that decides its programme of events and activities, and establishes working groups for particular projects.

Current Special Interest groups 

 Cybersecurity
 Measurement
 Functional Safety
 Flow Measurement
 Standards
 Automation and Control
 Digital Transformation
 Systems

Local Sections 

Members are able to join their nearest Local section, who are responsible for organising regional events. Each Local Section is represented on the Institute's Council, providing a direct link between the members and the council.

UK Local Sections 

 Central North-West
 East Midlands
 East of Scotland
 London
 Hertfordshire
 North Lincs
 Midlands
 North of Scotland
 Surrey and Sussex
 North East
 Wessex
 West of Scotland
 West Cumbria

Overseas Sections 

 Hong Kong
 Malaysia
 Texas
 Qatar

Address

Main Office 

297 Euston Road

London

NW1 3AD

T: 020 7387 4949

http://www.instmc.org.uk

Officers 

President - Dr Graham Machin  BSc (Hons), DPhil, DSc

Vice President - Mr M Belshaw

Chief Executive Officer - Dr Patrick Finlay

Hon Secretary – Dr G S Philp

Hon Treasurer – Mr C Howard

Past Presidents 

Notable former presidents of the Institute of Measurement and Control include:

Sir George Thomson MA FRS (1944–48)

Sir Harold Hartley GC VO FRS (1957–58)

L. Finkelstein MSc (1980–81)

MJH Sterling BEng Phd DEng (1988–89)

Prof W S Bardo FREng HonFInstMC (2010–12)

Lord Oxburgh KBE FRS Hon FREng (2012 - 2014)

Prof Sarah Spurgeon OBE

Affiliations 

International Measurement Confederation (IMEKO)
United Kingdom Automatic Control Council (UKACC)
National Physical Laboratory (NPL)
Trade Association for Instrumentation, Control, Automation and Laboratory Technology (GAMBICA)
Worshipful Company of Scientific Instrument Makers (SIM)
British Standards Institute (BSI)
Parliamentary and Scientific Committee

Arms

See also
 Control theory
 Information engineering

References 

 Engineering Council, UK.   ECUK Institution Details .  Accessed on 13 July 2007
 Institute of Measurement and Control.  History and Heritage.  Accessed on 13 July 2007

Further reading 
 Institute of Measurement and Control

1944 establishments in the United Kingdom
ECUK Licensed Members
Engineering societies based in the United Kingdom
Organisations based in the London Borough of Camden
Scientific organizations established in 1944